Joseph Veleno (born January 13, 2000) is a Canadian professional ice hockey forward for the  Detroit Red Wings of the National Hockey League (NHL). He was drafted 30th overall by the Red Wings in the 2018 NHL Entry Draft.

Playing career
On June 4, 2015, Veleno became the first player from Quebec to be granted "exceptional status" allowing him to play as a 15-year old in major junior hockey which led to him being selected 1st overall in the 2015 QMJHL draft by the Saint John Sea Dogs on June 7, 2015. He is the fifth player to be granted exceptional status, with the preceding four being John Tavares, Aaron Ekblad, Connor McDavid, and Sean Day.

On December 8, 2017, it was announced that Veleno had been traded to the Drummondville Voltigeurs in exchange for three first-round selections (in 2018, 2019 and 2020) and two second-round selections in the QMJHL draft. and ended the season with 79 points in 64 games.

Veleno was selected in the first round 30th overall by the Detroit Red Wings in the 2018 NHL entry draft. During the 2018–19 QMJHL season, in just 59 games with Drummondville, he produced 42 goals and 62 assists for a 104 total points, helping the Voltigeurs reach the semi finals of the QMJHL playoffs, when he produced a further 8 goals and 9 assists in 16 games.

On May 1, 2019, Veleno signed a three-year, entry-level contract with the Red Wings.

He did not make the Red Wings roster out of training camp, and began the 2019–20 season with the Wings AHL affiliate, the Grand Rapids Griffins.

With the 2020–21 NHL season delayed due to the COVID-19 pandemic, and the possibility of an AHL season in doubt, Veleno was loaned to Swedish club, the Malmö Redhawks for the 2020–21 season. Due to Swedish Hockey League rules, he was ineligible to return to North America until the Redhawks season concluded. In 46 appearances with the Redhawks, Veleno contributed with 11 goals and 20 points, before ending his loan in Sweden to be reassigned by the Red Wings to the Grand Rapids Griffins on April 10, 2021.

Veleno made his NHL debut for the Red Wings against the Columbus Blue Jackets on April 27, 2021.

Personal life
Veleno is of Italian descent. He was born in Kirkland, Quebec and still lives there in the offseason. His favourite team as a child was the Washington Capitals and his favourite player was Alexander Ovechkin. In addition to hockey, Veleno also played soccer and lacrosse as a child. He is fluent in English, French, and Italian.

Career statistics

Regular season and playoffs

International

References

External links
 

2000 births
Canadian expatriate ice hockey players in Sweden
Canadian ice hockey centres
Canadian people of Italian descent
Detroit Red Wings draft picks
Detroit Red Wings players
Drummondville Voltigeurs players
Grand Rapids Griffins players
Living people
Malmö Redhawks players
National Hockey League first-round draft picks
People from Kirkland, Quebec
Saint John Sea Dogs players
Ice hockey people from Montreal